Lactuca tatarica, known as blue lettuce, is a Eurasian flowering plant in the tribe Cichorieae within the family Asteraceae. It is widespread across much of Europe and Asia.

Lactuca tatarica is an herb up to 60 cm (2 feet) tall with a large taproot. Most of the leaves are near the base of the plant and are larger than leaves farther up the stem. Each flower head has about 20 blue or purple (rarely white) ray flowers and no disc flowers.

Some authors have placed the North American species Lactuca pulchella as a subspecies or variety of a broader concept of Lactuca tatarica, while others consider L. tatarica to occur only in Europe and Asia. Lactuca tatarica (with L. pulchella and others) is commonly separated into the genus Mulgedium, as Mulgedium tatarica.

References

tatarica
Flora of Europe
Flora of Asia
Plants described in 1753
Taxa named by Carl Linnaeus